The 1935 Cupa României Final was the second final of Romania's most prestigious football cup competition. It was disputed between Ripensia Timişoara and CFR București, and was won by CFR București after a game with 11 goals in extra time. It was the first cup trophy won by the feroviar team.

Match details

See also 
List of Cupa României finals

References

External links
Romaniansoccer.ro

1935
Cupa
Romania